The Glitterati is the debut album by The Glitterati.

Track listing
 "Betterman"
 "You Got Nothing On Me"
 "Heartbreaker"
 "Back In Power"
 "Do You Love Yourself?"
 "Don't Do Romance"
 "First Floor"
 "You Need You"
 "Still Thinking About You"
 "Here Comes A Close Up" – 3:26
 "Keep Me Up All Night" – 2:01

Singles
 "Do You Love Yourself?" (2003)
 "You Got Nothing On Me" (2005)
 "Heartbreaker" (2005)
 "Back In Power" (2005)

References

2005 debut albums